Rhoda Trooboff is an American educator, publisher, and author.

Education 
Trooboff studied at Wellesley College where she earned an undergraduate degree in English. She got a MAT degree from Harvard's Graduate School of Education.

Career 
Trooboff worked as a teacher in Arlington, VA public schools. She was the head of the English department at the National Cathedral School in Washington, D.C. She also serves as a child protection mediator in the DC Superior Courts and volunteered as a reader at Learning Ally, an organization that records and reads books for the blind and dyslexic.

Publications 
In 2005, she founded Tenley Circle Press, a micro-publishing house in Washington, DC for children's books.

Her writings include:

Ben ,The Bells and the Peacocks (Tenley Circle Press, 2006)

A Book for Elie (Tenley Circle Press, 2008)

Punkinhead's Veggie Adventure and the Strange Contraption in the Kitchen (Tenley Circle Press, 2013)

In 2010, Trooboff edited We Grew It: Let's Eat It (Tenley Circle Press, 2010), and was interviewed by NPR about her educational gardening work.

In 2014, Trooboff wrote her first novel, Correspondence Course: The Bathsua Project. 

Her books were the only publications featured in the 2020 Seymour Art festival of the Garrett County Arts Council & Simon Pearce Partnership.

Personal life 
Trooboff is married to Peter, a lawyer. They have two daughters and five grandchildren. She is an avid gardener and member of the DC Neighborhood Farm Initiative.

References 

Living people
Wellesley College alumni
Harvard Graduate School of Education alumni
Year of birth missing (living people)
American writers